Podperaea baii is a species of moss from the genus Podperaea. It was discovered (possibly found in Russia) by Mikhail Stanislavovich Ignatov in 2011.   In 2020, Podperaea baii had a synonym named Redfearnia baii.

References

Hypnaceae